Élie Califer (born 19 April 1954) is a French politician who was elected to represent Guadeloupe's 4th constituency in the 2022 legislative election. A member of the Socialist Party, his candidacy was supported by the New Ecologic and Social People's Union (NUPES) coalition.

Biography 
Califer was born on 19 April 1954 in Saint-Claude, Guadeloupe. He served as mayor of Saint-Claude, Guadeloupe. In 2022, he ran to succeed Hélène Vainqueur-Christophe as member of Guadeloupe's 4th constituency in the National Assembly. Califer advanced to the second round of the contest, where he faced Marie-Luce Penchard of the Ensemble Citoyens coalition. However, Penchard dropped out during the second round, allowing Califer to automatically win the election.

References 

Living people
1954 births
People from Saint-Claude, Guadeloupe
Guadeloupean politicians
Black French politicians
Members of the National Assembly (France)
21st-century French politicians
Deputies of the 16th National Assembly of the French Fifth Republic